Santiago Maresca (born 14 September 1994) is a Uruguayan former professional tennis player.

Maresca has a career high ATP singles ranking of 884, achieved on 11 September 2017. He also has a career high ATP doubles ranking of 746, achieved on 19 June 2017.

Maresca represented Uruguay at the Davis Cup, where he has a win–loss record of 2–5.

External links

1994 births
Living people
Uruguayan male tennis players
Sportspeople from Montevideo